is a public junior college in Akishima, Tokyo, Japan.

History 
The predecessor of the school was founded in 1947 in Tachikawa, Tokyo.

The private junior college opened in 1950. It became a public junior college in 1959. It moved to Akishima in 1969.

The junior college closed in 2008.

Academic departments
 Food nutrition
 Home economics

Advanced courses
 Food nutrition
 Home economics

See also 
 Tokyo Metropolitan University
 Tokyo Metropolitan College of Commerce

References

Japanese junior colleges
Universities and colleges in Tokyo
Educational institutions established in 1950
1950 establishments in Japan